Cécile Muschotti is a French politician who has been serving as a member of the National Assembly since 2017, representing the 2nd district of Var.

In parliament, Muschotti serves as member of the Committee on Cultural Affairs and Education.

In 2020, Muschotti joined En commun (EC), a group within LREM led by Barbara Pompili.

References

Living people
People from Var (department)
Women members of the National Assembly (France)
La République En Marche! politicians
21st-century French women politicians
Deputies of the 15th National Assembly of the French Fifth Republic
1987 births